The Big Brother Movement was a youth migration program run by a non-profit organisation based in Sydney, Australia. It aimed to bring youths from Britain to Australia to work on farms or in the Australian outback. With the cooperation of the Australian Immigration Department the movement was founded by Sir Richard Linton in 1924. According to the Australian Dictionary of Biography, "the idea for the Big Brother Movement grew out of Linton's own experience of arriving in Sydney from New Zealand knowing that his elder brother was already there to assist him".

According to a recently published book on the subject, the so-called Little Brother immigrant was "assigned to a Big Brother, resident citizen for advice, solace and companionship" within the framework of the patrie.

Prior to World War II around 8,000 youths immigrated to Australia under the scheme. It was revived after the war and continued in a modified form in New South Wales until 1983. Notable "Little Brothers" included Bill Burns. Notable "Big Brothers" (or officeholders in the movement) included Archibald Gilchrist, Bill McCann, and Leslie Morshead.

See also
Ten Pound Pom
Italian migration post World War 2
Sudanese migration

References

5 ships travelled from England to Australia during the Big Brother movement including the Jervis Bay named after Perth's waters as the boat sailed into Fremantle harbour. The movement ceased when world war 2 began and resumed in 1947 2 years after the war. During this time Italians and other Europeans arrived in Australia as their country was war torn.

External links
 BBM Ltd
 Biography of Sir Richard Linton

History of immigration to Australia
Interwar period
History of Australia (1901–1945)
 
1924 establishments in Australia
1924 establishments in the United Kingdom
1983 disestablishments in Australia
1983 disestablishments in the United Kingdom
Australia–United Kingdom relations
Settlement schemes in Australia